Lyndon Rive (born 22 January 1977) is a South African businessman known as the co-founder of SolarCity, and its CEO until 2016. SolarCity is a provider of photovoltaic systems and related services. Rive co-founded SolarCity with his brother Peter in 2006. 

Rive started his first company at age 17 before leaving his native South Africa. He then co-founded the enterprise software company Everdream, which was ultimately acquired by Dell. In his spare time, Rive plays underwater hockey. Rive is a cousin of Elon Musk as their mothers are twin sisters.

In 2010, Rive was named in the MIT Technology Review's Innovators Under 35 as one of the top 35 innovators in the world under the age of 35.

After Tesla, Inc. acquired SolarCity in 2016, Rive announced in 2017 that he would leave the company and spend his time with his family along with further entrepreneurial activities, including working on a new startup.

Awards 
In 2013, Rive was an Ernst & Young Entrepreneur of the Year Award winner in the Northern California Region.

References 

1977 births
Living people
People associated with solar power
People from Pretoria
South African expatriates in the United States
Musk family
South African people of Canadian descent
White South African people